A list of rivers of Berlin, Germany:

B
Bäke

D
Dahme

F
Fredersdorfer Mühlenfließ

H
Havel

K
Kindelfließ

P
Panke

S
Spree

T
Tegeler Fließ

 
Berlin
Berlin